Patiala Lok Sabha constituency is one of the 13 Lok Sabha (parliamentary) constituencies in Punjab state in northern India.

Assembly segments
This constituency comprises nine Vidhan Sabha (legislative assembly) segments. These are:

Members of Parliament

Election results

General Elections - 2019

General Elections - 2014

General Elections 2009

See also
 Patiala district
 List of Constituencies of the Lok Sabha

Notes

External links
Patiala lok sabha  constituency election 2019 result details

Lok Sabha constituencies in Punjab, India
Patiala district